Gompholobium minus, commonly known as dwarf wedge-pea, is a species of flowering plant in the pea family Fabaceae and is endemic to New South Wales. It is a low, spreading shrub with trifoliate leaves and yellow flowers.

Description

Taxonomy
Gompholobium minus was first formally described in 1805 by James Edward Smith in Annals of Botany. The specific epithet (minus) means "smaller".

Distribution and habitat
Dwarf wedge-pea grows in forest, woodland, heathland and scrub and is widespread on the coast and ranges of New South Wales south from the Hunter Valley.

References

minus
Mirbelioids
Fabales of Australia
Flora of New South Wales
Plants described in 1805
Taxa named by James Edward Smith